Minstrel in the Galaxy is an album by Acid Mothers Temple & The Melting Paraiso U.F.O.,  released in 2004 by Riot Season. This was the first Acid Mothers Temple album not to feature Cotton Casino on vocals, instead featuring Afrirampo members, Oni & Pikacyu. The album title is a play on the name of the Jethro Tull album Minstrel in the Gallery.

Track listing

Personnel 

 Tsuyama Atsushi - monster bass, vocal, acoustic guitar, cosmic joker
 Higashi Hiroshi - synthesizer, guitar, dancin'king
 Koizumi Hajime - drums, sleeping monk
 Kawabata Makoto - guitar, sarangi, bouzouki, tambura, speed guru

Guests 

 Tiffany - voice on "Cosmic Introduction"
 Oni & Pikacyu (from Afrirampo) - voice on "Minstrel In The Galaxy"

Technical personnel 

 Kawabata Makoto - Production and Engineering, Photography
 Yoshida Tatsuya - Mastering
 Kawabata Sachiko - Artwork

References 

Acid Mothers Temple albums
2004 albums